Bruce Dennistoun Lang (Bruce Lane in some sources; 10 April 1889 – 22 July 1974) was an Australian rules footballer who played with University in the Victorian Football League in 1912.

The son of Alexander Bruce Lang and Florence Henrietta Hall, Bruce Lang was born in April 1889. He attended Melbourne Grammar School and while studying Medicine at the University of Melbourne made six VFL appearances for University in 1912.

He enlisted soon after the outbreak of World War I, in August 1914, leaving Australia on 18 October 1914. He arrived at Anzac Cove on 3 May 1915 and after taking part in operations there returned to Australia and was discharged on 1 May 1916. He re-enlisted on 29 August 1918 and re-embarked on 16 October 1918, but the war ended before he arrived in Europe.

After returning to Australia, Lang became a farmer at Swan Hill after receiving land under the Soldier Settlement scheme. He died in 1974.

References

External links

1889 births
Australian rules footballers from Melbourne
University Football Club players
People educated at Melbourne Grammar School
Australian military personnel of World War I
1974 deaths
People from Malvern, Victoria
Military personnel from Melbourne